Yamdena (spelt Jamdena during the Dutch colonial period) is the largest of the Tanimbar Islands in the Maluku Province of Indonesia. Saumlaki is the chief town, located on the south end of the island.

The island has a range of forested hills along its eastern coast, while its western coast is lower. The forests are inhabited by wild water buffalo.

The Yamdena language is spoken on and around the island. Christianity is the main religion, but ancestor worship is still practised. Handicrafts on the island include woodcarving, fine goldwork, Ikat weaving (mainly on nearby Selaru Island). In 1987 a new species of Bush Warbler was recorded on the island.

Megalith: In the village of Sangliat Dol there is an antique stone stairway that leads from the beach to a boat shaped stone platform.
There are several similar ones but less preserved sites on the island which originally represented the boats on which the inhabitants' ancient ancestors arrived on the island.

Transport
Saumlaki is linked by air and sea to Langgur-Tual in the Kei Islands.

Gallery

References

External links
 Yamdena Wordlist at the Austronesian Basic Vocabulary Database

Tanimbar Islands
Populated places in Indonesia
Islands of Indonesia